Albert Irving Strobel (June 11, 1884 – February 10, 1955) was a second baseman in Major League Baseball. He played for the Boston Beaneaters.

References

External links

1884 births
1955 deaths
Major League Baseball second basemen
Boston Beaneaters players
Trenton Tigers players
Baseball players from Boston